Physokermes are a genus of scale insects known as the bud scales. They are restricted to the Holarctic, though Physokermes hemicryphus has been introduced to North America. Some species are plant pests.

Morphology
Pre-reproductive females are membranous and reddish-brown, once females begin to lay eggs they are globular or kidney-shaped become light to dark brown, and eventually heavily sclerotized. The adult females resemble the bud of their coniferous hosts, hence the name bud scale.

Physokermes are difficult to identify to species, as only pre-reproductive females can be used. Once females begin to oviposit, their bodies become distorted and it is not possible to detect the morphological features necessary to identify them to species.

Species
There are 13 described species in the genus Physokermes:

Physokermes coloradensis Cockerell 1895
Physokermes concolor Coleman 1903 - fir bud-scale
Physokermes fasciatusBorchsenius 1957
Physokermes hellenicus Kozár & Gounari 2012
Physokermes hemicryphus (Dalman) 1826 - small spruce bud-scale
Physokermes inopinatus Danzig & Kozár 1973 - Hungarian spruce bud-scale
Physokermes insignicola (Craw) 1894 - Montery pine scale
Physokermes jezoensis Siraiwa 1939
Physokermes picaefoliae Tang 1984
Physokermes piceae (Schrank) 1801 - spruce bud-scale
Physokermes shanxiensis Tang 1991
Physokermes sugonjaevi Danzig 1972
Physokermes taxifoliae Coleman 1903 - Douglas fir scale

References

Sternorrhyncha genera
Coccidae